Orokaiva may be:
Orokaiva people
Orokaiva language